Afikpo North is a Local Government Area of Ebonyi State, Nigeria. Its headquarters is in the town of Ehugbo, Afikpo. Important townships include Ehugbo (with Itim Ukwu, Ohaisu, Nkpoghoro, Ugwuegu/Amaizu, Ozizza autonomous   communities characteristic of towns too) Unwana and Amasiri. Other notable areas are Ibii and Akpoha . 
 
It has an area of 240 km and a population of 881,611 at the 2021. Its postal code is 490.
The major language is a more localised form of the Igbo language known as the 'Ehugbo Language'. It has a rich Igbo traditional heritage and culture and has festivals like the 'New Yam Festival' that hold at the end of the Month of August every year. Which marks the beginning of a new Traditional Year.

Igbo traditional centre

Afikpo is a centre of ancient Igbo tradition. Ceremonial (now antique) masks have been carefully preserved by the state tourism board. Afikpo is an ancient city-state. Several archaeological findings support the claim that Afikpo civilisation existed as far back as the Neolithic age.

There is a rite of passage for every male child from Afikpo. This entails initiation into the Ogo cult. It is shrouded in secrecy and mystery, as women are not let into the workings of the cult. This confers adulthood to the male child.

Higher institutions in Afikpo North

 Mater Misericordia Hospital School of Nursing and Midwifery
 Akanu Ibiam Federal Polytechnic, Unwana

Notable people

 Chris Abani, Nigerian-American author
 Uche Azikiwe, premier first Lady of Nigeria, wife of Nnamdi Azikiwe
 Onyebuchi Chukwu, Minister of Health from 2010 until 2014
 Priscilla Ekwere Eleje, first woman to have her signature on the naira note
 Akanu Ibiam, first governor of Eastern Nigeria, predecessor of Chukwuemeka Ojukwu

References

Local Government Areas in Ebonyi State